Wellington Point State High School is a coeducational secondary school located on Badgen Road in Wellington Point, Queensland; a locality of Redland Shire.  The school is now home to over 1100 students.

History 
Wellington Point State High School opened in January 1988, along with the closely located but privately run Redlands College. It is one of the 6 public high schools located in the Redland Shire along with a further 6 non-government high schools.  The school is governed under the motto of "Aim High" and the mascot of the osprey.

Facilities 
Wellington Point State High School endeavors to accommodate the needs of all students, offering a wide range of study areas, and a number of impressive facilities such as a fully functional theatre (The Osprey Theatre) and a Multi Purpose Shelter (MPS) for assemblies and sporting activities. It is also currently upgrading and replacing old computers in many rooms to keep up with the technology revolution. The school has developed a number of unique programs to encourage the steady educational development of students.  Such a program is 'The Acceleration Program', which allows gifted year 10 students to undertake year 11 subjects, giving the student the option of beginning a tertiary course in their senior year.  Among these other programs that have been incorporated into our school syllabus, we also have courses that train students in different areas so that they may receive certificates at the end of these courses.

Student Welfare 
There are over 1,100 students attending the school. Subjects that the school offers include subjects such as Science, Mathematics, English and Studies of Social Environments (S.O.S.E). There are also others such as Business, Technology, Woodwork, Metalwork, Graphics, Home Economics, Japanese and many more.

External links 
 Wellington Point State High School Official Website

References 

Public high schools in Queensland
Schools in South East Queensland
Educational institutions established in 1988
Wellington Point, Queensland
1988 establishments in Australia
Buildings and structures in Redland City